Ditrigona furvicosta is a moth in the family Drepanidae. It was described by George Hampson in 1911. It is found in India (Sikkim, Darjeeling), western China and probably Tibet.

The wingspan is 12.5-15.5 mm for males and 15.5 mm for females. The forewings are white with a conspicuous buff costa. There are five brownish-grey, weakly lunulate transverse fasciae, consisting of indistinct sub-basal, antemedial, postmedial and two subterminal fasciae with the greatest distance between antemedial and postmedial fasciae. The hindwings are similar to the forewings in colour and pattern.

References

Moths described in 1911
Drepaninae
Moths of Asia